The Promoting Adoption and Legal Guardianship for Children in Foster Care Act is a bill that would extend and modify an existing grant program.  States use the grants to match up families who want to adopt children with kids who are in foster care.  The bill was introduced in the United States House of Representatives during the 113th United States Congress.

Provisions of the bill
The Adoption Incentives program is found in Section 473A of the Social Security Act.  This program would be reauthorized and modified by the Promoting Adoption and Legal Guardianship for Children in Foster Care Act.  The bill would reauthorize the program for three years.  It would also change the method used to calculate whether a state received a grant.  Under existing law, states are rewarded by the raw number of adoptions they facilitate.  The Promoting Adoption and Legal Guardianship for Children in Foster Care Act would change this to measure the adoption rate instead, to "ensure that state receive awards even while cost care caseloads continue to decline."

Procedural history

House
The Promoting Adoption and Legal Guardianship for Children in Foster Care Act was introduced into the House on September 27, 2013 by Rep. Dave Camp (R, MI-4).  It was referred to the United States House Committee on Ways and Means.  On October 17, 2013, House Majority Leader Eric Cantor announced that H.R. 2083 was scheduled for a vote under a suspension of the rules on October 22, 2013. The House passed the bill on October 22, 2013 in Roll Call Vote 552 by a vote of 402–0.

Debate and discussion
The bill was considered to be nonpartisan.  Newspaper The Hill said that this bill and three others from the week of October 21, 2013, would give the House "a chance to practice the long-forgotten art of working together."  This was a reference to the contentious United States federal government shutdown of 2013, which ended the previous week.

See also
List of bills in the 113th United States Congress
Adoption in the United States

Notes/References

External links

Library of Congress – Thomas H.R. 3205
beta.congress.gov H.R. 3205
GovTrack.us H.R. 3205
OpenCongress.org H.R. 3205
WashingtonWatch.com H.R. 3205
House Republican Conference's legislative digest on H.R. 3205
Congressional Research Service Report: Child Welfare: Structure and Funding of the Adoption Incentives Program along with Reauthorization Issues
Congressional Budget Office's report on H.R. 3205

Adoption in the United States